Cyclemys is a genus of freshwater turtles, commonly referred to as Asian leaf turtles, from the family Geoemydidae. The genus occurs throughout Southeast and South Asia, and currently contains seven species.

Asian leaf turtles average  in length. They are mostly brown to greenish in color, with round to rectangular shells. Their carapaces bear a superficial resemblance to plant leaves, hence their common name. They can be found around shallow, slow-moving bodies of water in hilly forests. Adults are primarily terrestrial, though juveniles are more aquatic.

Taxonomy and nomenclature
Cyclemys turtles belong to the family Geoemydidae under the subfamily Geoemydinae. They were first described in 1834 by English zoologist Thomas Bell in his work A Monograph of the Testudinata. Cyclemys and closely related genera (Cuora, Pyxidea, and Notochelys) are believed to have diverged from a common Heosemys-like ancestor.

Cyclemys taxonomy and phylogeny have been historically difficult to ascertain due to the morphological similarity between species, as well as changes in the color patterns during growth. Until recently, the genus was thought to comprise only one or two morphologically variable species, C. dentata and C. oldhamii. Subsequent investigation has now put the number of species under the genus to seven, though this remains controversial. The status of C. enigmatica as a valid species is contested, as is the recognition of C. atripons and C. pulchristiata, both of which are nearly impossible to tell apart morphologically.

Previously recognized species, C. tcheponensis ( = C. tiannanensis) and C. shanensis, have been merged into C. oldhamii following mtDNA sequencing. The conclusions of which showed that the morphological differences between them (the presence or absence of neck/head stripes, and hatchling color patterns) were not enough to classify them as separate species. C. ovata has been similarly subsumed into C. dentata.

The two distinct morphological differences between Cyclemys species are based on the main color of their plastrons - species with yellow bellies (C. atripons, C. dentata, and C. pulchristiata), and species with dark bellies (C. enigmatica, C. fusca, C. gemeli, and C. oldhamii).

Synonyms of Cyclemys (ex errore) include: Cyclemus Li, Cyclemis Good, and Cyclemy Mao.

They are known under the common name Asian leaf turtles or simply leaf turtles, again because of the appearance of their carapaces. They share the collective name 'leaf turtles' with turtles of the genus Geoemyda, as well as turtles with 'leaf' in their names, such as the Annam leaf turtle (Mauremys annamensis), among others. 'Asian leaf turtle' is also the specific common name of C. dentata.

Description 
 
Cyclemys turtles are characterized by more or less round carapaces, which are typically dark green, brownish, tan, or olive in color.  The shell may have a prominent vertebral keel running from head to tail. Serrated marginal scutes are common in juveniles. In adults, only the posterior marginal scutes are serrated.

Adults of Cyclemys also develop a joint in the middle of their plastrons (known as a plastral hinge), enabling them to articulate the front and rear halves to some extent. Unlike the closely related Cuora, which can completely close its shell because of the hinge, Cyclemys plastral hinges only close the shell partially. The plastral hinge may also play a significant role in facilitating egg-laying in adult females.

A distinguishing characteristic of the genus is the secondary division of the abdominal scutes (the middle pair of scutes in the plastron) due to the development of the plastral hinge as the turtle matures. It eventually leads to the formation of small triangular additional scutes between the abdominal and pectoral scutes.

Cyclemys turtles are cryptodires, having the ability to pull their heads straight back and vertically into their shells instead of folding them sideways like pleurodires. The head varies between species from dull to striped with bright red or orange bands of color. The plastron can have a dark or light (tan to yellow) background which can be uniform or patterned with fine lines radiating from the center of each plastral scute.

Their feet are partially webbed and well developed for either aquatic or terrestrial mobility.

Cyclemys species achieve sexual maturity after seven to 12 years, earlier for males and later for females. Sexual dimorphism is apparently mostly absent, though females are likely to outgrow males. Females usually deposit 10 to 15 eggs per clutch.

Lifespan
A C. dentata individual has been recorded living up to 14.7 years in captivity. However, an adult specimen caught in the wild has also been recorded living another 14 years, making it likely that the maximum lifespan of Cyclemys species has been underestimated.

Distribution and habitat

The distribution ranges of individual species of Cyclemys remain unclear, but the genus occurs in South Asia and Indochina (Vietnam, Myanmar, Laos, Cambodia, Myanmar, Thailand, central to southern China, Bangladesh, Nepal, and northeastern India), as well as the Southeast Asian countries of Malaysia, Indonesia, Brunei, and the Philippines.

Adults spend most of their time on land. They can be found near ponds, streams, and other shallow, slow-moving bodies of water in hilly forests.

They are omnivorous, but juveniles tend to be more carnivorous.  Because their prey are typically aquatic, the younger turtles are found in water more often than adults.

Species
The species are listed alphabetically along with common names, identifying adult characteristics, and known geographical distribution. They are divided into two morphologically distinct groups.

Yellow-bellied species
Cyclemys atripons  (Iverson & McCold, 1997) – western black-bridged leaf turtle or striped leaf turtle
Cyclemys dentata (Gray, 1831) –  Asian leaf turtle or brown stream terrapin
Cyclemys pulchristiata (Fritz, Gaulke, and Lehr 1997) – eastern black-bridged leaf turtle

Dark-bellied species
Cyclemys enigmatica Fritz, Guicking, Auer, Sommer, Wink & Hundsdörfer, 2008 – enigmatic leaf turtle
Cyclemys fusca Fritz, Guicking, Auer, Sommer, Wink & Hundsdörfer, 2008 – Myanmar brown leaf turtle
Cyclemys gemeli Fritz, Guicking, Auer, Sommer, Wink & Hundsdörfer, 2008 – Assam leaf turtle
Cyclemys oldhamii Gray, 1863 – Oldham's leaf turtle, Southeast Asian leaf turtle

Several species previously classified under Cyclemys – C. amboinensis, C. flavomarginata, C. mouhotti, and C. trifasciata – are now classified under the genus Cuora. C. annandalii is now classified under Heosemys, C. annamensis under Mauremys, and C. giebelii as Notochelys platynota.

Conservation
Cyclemys species are often caught and sold for the pet trade, food, or traditional medicine. On August 25, 1998, Forest Protection authorities of Vietnam confiscated a shipment of about 700 turtles with an estimated 30 individuals of C. oldhamii. In May 2007, more than 3000 individuals of Cyclemys, along with Asian box turtles, were confiscated in hundreds of crates in Yangjiang, China.

The most commonly encountered species of Cyclemys in the pet trade, C. dentata, is now being captive bred. They are usually preferred, as they are healthier, more acclimated to handling, and captive breeding minimizes the impact on wild populations.

The confusion over their exact taxonomy and distribution led to an incomplete assessment of their conservation status by the IUCN. In 1991, with only two species recognized, Cyclemys was given the Action Plan Rating of 3 - in need of some conservation action. In the last assessment in 2000 by the Asian Turtle Trade Working Group of IUCN, the different species currently recognized under the genus Cyclemys were treated as all belonging to the species C. dentata. This resulted in the current incorrect classification of all of the species as lower risk/near threatened. Until now, the true conservation status, the actual effects of wildlife trade, deforestation, and habitat loss on individual Cyclemys species, have yet to be studied.

See also

Cuora, Asian box turtles
Geoemydidae
Geoemyda
Mauremys, pond turtles
Turtle

References

External links
 Care Sheets for Asian leaf turtles
 Asian leaf turtles - Cyclemys
 Video of a pet Cyclemys dentata

 
Turtle genera
Taxa named by Thomas Bell (zoologist)